Skegby is a village in the Ashfield district of Nottinghamshire, England.  The village and its surrounding area contain ten listed buildings that are recorded in the National Heritage List for England.  All the listed buildings are designated at Grade II, the lowest of the three grades, which is applied to "buildings of national importance and special interest".  The listed buildings consist of houses, a church, a pinfold, and two war memorials.


Buildings

References

Citations

Sources

 

Lists of listed buildings in Nottinghamshire